William Álvarez may refer to:

William Álvarez (footballer) (born 1995), Bolivian international footballer
William Álvarez (tennis) (born 1936), Colombian-Spanish tennis coach